Dmitri Prudnikov (born 6 January 1988) is a Russian futsal player who is currently playing for Sinara, and the Russian national futsal team.

Biography
Prudnikov was born in Krasnoturinsk. Up to 14 years he played futsal at a local school, but then he was noticed by the main regional futsal club Viz-Sinara, and Dmitriy moved to Yekaterinburg.

Since 2004 Dmitry has been involved in the first team, but the first full season of his career was the 2005/06 season. Then he scored 14 goals and contributed to the first silver medal of his team. In the following season Prudnikov scored 18 goals. In the final game of the Futsal Russian Cup Dmitry helped Yekaterinburg to become the owner of an honorary trophy.

Prudnikov’s long-awaited debut in the Russian national team took place on 27 January 2008 in the game against Croatia. The next day, Dmitry scored his first goal for the national team in Ukrainian gate, bringing his victory to his team.

In April 2008, "Viz-Sinara" had to participate in the final games of the UEFA Futsal Cup. Dmitry helped the team to win the tournament and to get the title of the strongest team of Europe.

At the beginning of the 2008 World Cup he became one of the major discoveries of the tournament. With seven goals scored the young player entered the top ten scorers in the championship.

2008 ended with the first-ever Youth Championship of Europe. Dmitry was the captain of the Russian national team. He scored the only goal of the semifinal against Ukraine, the decisive goal of the final match against Italy and raised the league cup over his head. Soon he was recognized the best young player in the world by «UMBRO Futsal Awards».

Achievements
UEFA Futsal Championship silver medalist (1): 2012
UEFA Futsal Cup Winner (1): 2007-08
Russian Futsal Championship Winner (3): 2009, 2010, 2014, 2021
Russian Futsal Cup Winner (1): 2007, 2017
FIFA Futsal World Cup semifinalist (1): 2008
UEFA European Youth Championship Winner (1): 2008

Personal
The best player of the Russian championship: 2011
The best forward of the Russian championship (2): 2009, 2010, 2012

References

External links
MFK Dina Moskva profile
UEFA profile
AMFR profile

1988 births
Living people
Russian men's futsal players
MFK Dina Moskva players
People from Krasnoturyinsk
Sportspeople from Sverdlovsk Oblast